Kathryn M Smith is a female former swimmer who competed for England.

Swimming career
She represented England and won a silver medal in the 4 × 100 metres medley relay and a bronze medal in the 4 × 100 metres freestyle relay, at the 1970 British Commonwealth Games in Edinburgh, Scotland.

References

English female swimmers
Commonwealth Games medallists in swimming
Commonwealth Games silver medallists for England
Commonwealth Games bronze medallists for England
Swimmers at the 1970 British Commonwealth Games
Living people
Year of birth missing (living people)
Medallists at the 1970 British Commonwealth Games